The giant horse (Equus giganteus) is an extinct species of horse which lived in North America.

It was classified as a species based on the finding of a single tooth larger than the teeth of even the largest modern draft horses.

References

Pleistocene horses
Fossil taxa described in 1901
Pleistocene mammals of North America